Athanasios Papazoglou (born 30 March 1988), commonly known as Thanasis Papazoglou, is a Greek professional footballer who plays as a striker for Gamma Ethniki club Thermaikos.

Club career

Aris
Papazoglou made his professional debut for Aris in the 2007–08 Greek Superleague. He was promoted to the first team by coach Dušan Bajević. On 8 November 2007, he scored 2 goals in a 3–0 win against Red Star Belgrade in the Europa League. After his injuries kept him from maintaining his form, Papazoglou lost coach Mazinho's confidence and was sold to fellow Superleague side PAOK FC.

On 1 June 2009, Papazoglou signed a 4-year contract with PAOK FC. He was loaned to Asteras Tripoli for the 2010–11 season.

OFI Crete
On 8 August 2012, Papazoglou signed a two year contract with OFI Crete. After some good displays for his new club, he was linked to a number of teams from England. At the end of the 2013–14 season, Papazoglou terminated his contract with OFI Crete in order to move to Olympiakos, but only played in friendly games for the latter.

On August 8, 2014 Papazoglou signed a two year contract with Greek club Atromitos. He scored his first goal for them two weeks later in a 1–0 home victory against Platanias.

Kortrijk
In the summer of 2015 he moved to Belgian First Division A club Kortrijk, and later signed a three year contract for an undisclosed fee. On 25 July 2015, he made his debut for Kortrijk as he scored the only goal in a 2–1 away loss at Club Brugge KV.

On 17 October 2015, in a game against Stergos Marinos's club Sporting Charleroi he scored the first goal in a 2–0 home win.  On 22 November 2015, he gave the lead to his club in a final 1–1 away draw against Standard Liège. On 28 November 2015, he scored his fifth goal in the League in a 3–1 home win against Waasland-Beveren. On 23 April 2016, he scored a goal and gave an assist in a 5–0 home win against Waasland-Beveren. He started the 2016–17 season as a starter, but gradually lost his place in the starting eleven, usually playing a few minutes as a late substitute.

On 28 December 2016, it was announced that Papazoglou was sent on loan to Dutch Eredivisie side Roda Kerkrade for the rest of the season.

On 28 July 2017, Papazoglou joined Norwegian Eliteserien side Aalesunds FK on loan from Kortrijk for the rest of the season. On 6 August 2017, he made his league debut with a penalty goal in a 3–3 home draw against SK Brann. A week later Papazoglou helped Aalesunds gain a point in the last minute of the game in a 1–1 home draw against Viking FK.

Hapoel Haifa

In the summer of 2018 Papazoglou moved to Israeli club Hapoel Haifa. He immediately impressed manager Nir Klinger and was included on the Europa League list. On 26 July 2018, he made his first appearance for Hapoel coming in as a substitute and scoring the only goal in a 1–1 draw against Fimleikafélag Hafnarfjarðar in the Europa League. On 29 July 2018, he won the Israel Super Cup after a penalty shoot-out win against Hapoel Be'er Sheva F.C.

Dinamo București
On February 1, 2019 Papazoglou signed a one-and-a-half year contract with Romanian club Dinamo București. On 10 July 2019, Papazoglou was released by the club.

Voluntari
On 18 July 2019 Papazoglou signed a year contract with Romanian club FC Voluntari. On 8 January 2020, Voluntari mutually agreed to terminate the contracts of four players: Athanasios Papazoglou, Constantin Nica, Avtandil Ebralidze and Martin Harrer.

AEL
On 3 January 2020, Papazoglou signed a year-and-a-half contract with Greek club AEL for an undisclosed fee.

Xanthi F.C.
On 3 October 2020, Papazoglou signed a contract with Greek club Xanthi F.C. for an undisclosed fee.

International career
Papazoglou played for Greece U19 and Greece U21 from 2007 to 2010 respectively. He was a part of the Greece U-19 selection at the 2007 U-19 European Championship in Austria, where Greece eventually lost to Spain in the final. On 29 March 2016, Papazoglou made his full debut for the Greece national team in a 2–3 home loss against Iceland, coming in as a substitute.

Career statistics

Honours

Club
Aris
Greek Football Cup: Runner-up 2007–08

Hapoel Haifa
Israel Super Cup: 2018

International
Greece U19
Under-19 European Championship: Runner-up 2007

Personal life
Papazoglou has been dating Vasiliki Tsirogianni, the winner of Star Hellas 2012, since 2011.

References

External links
The Papazoglou topic on greeksoccer.com

1988 births
Living people
Footballers from Thessaloniki
Greek footballers
Association football forwards
Aris Thessaloniki F.C. players
PAOK FC players
Asteras Tripolis F.C. players
OFI Crete F.C. players
Olympiacos F.C. players
Atromitos F.C. players
K.V. Kortrijk players
Roda JC Kerkrade players
Aalesunds FK players
Hapoel Haifa F.C. players
FC Dinamo București players
FC Voluntari players
Athlitiki Enosi Larissa F.C. players
Xanthi F.C. players
Rodos F.C. players
Super League Greece players
Belgian Pro League players
Eredivisie players
Eliteserien players
Liga I players
Israeli Premier League players
Super League Greece 2 players
Greek expatriate footballers
Greek expatriate sportspeople in Belgium
Expatriate footballers in Belgium
Greek expatriate sportspeople in the Netherlands
Expatriate footballers in the Netherlands
Greek expatriate sportspeople in Norway
Expatriate footballers in Norway
Greek expatriate sportspeople in Romania
Expatriate footballers in Romania
Greek expatriate sportspeople in Israel
Expatriate footballers in Israel
Greece youth international footballers
Greece under-21 international footballers
Greece international footballers